1,3,5-Trinitrobenzene is an organic compound with the formula C6H3(NO2)3. It is one of three trinitrated benzene-derivatives. A pale yellow solid, the compound is highly explosive.

Synthesis and reactions
1,3,5-Trinitrobenzene is produced by decarboxylation of 2,4,6-trinitrobenzoic acid.

1,3,5-Trinitrobenzene forms charge-transfer complexes with electron-rich arenes.

Reduction of 1,3,5-trinitrobenzene gives 1,3,5-triaminobenzene, a precursor to phloroglucinol.

Uses and applications
Trinitrobenzene is more explosive than TNT, but more expensive. It is primarily used as a high explosive compound for commercial mining and military applications. It has also been used as a narrow-range pH indicator, an agent to vulcanize natural rubber, and a mediating agent to mediate the synthesis of other explosive compounds.

See also
 1,2,3-Trinitrobenzene
 TNT equivalent
 RE factor

References

Nitrobenzenes
Explosive chemicals